The 1991 Tennents' Sixes was the eighth staging of the indoor 6-a-side football tournament. It was held at the Scottish Exhibition and Conference Centre (SECC) in Glasgow on 20 and 21 January.

Clubs from the 1990-91 Scottish Premier Division season competed, except Rangers who were replaced by First Division side Airdrieonains. The two group winners and runners-up qualified to the semi-finals; in the final Hearts beat Motherwell 5–2 to win their second Sixes title (a year after Edinburgh rivals Hibernian won the tournament).

Group 1

Group 2

Semi-finals

Final

References

External links
Scottish Football Historical Archive

1990–91 in Scottish football
Tennents' Sixes
January 1991 sports events in the United Kingdom
1990s in Glasgow
Football in Glasgow
Sports competitions in Glasgow